Paternalistic deception is deception that is apparently performed for the deceived individual's own good by a person assuming a paternalistic role, whether they are their actual parent or not. It is justified by the good it attempts to produce towards the deceived individual's well-being.

An example of paternalistic deception would be a doctor telling a parent that their child is doing well, even though they know that they are going to die. The doctor acted paternalistically to spare the parent's feelings.

Issues
 If the deceived individual could judge, would they consent to being deceived? This leads those acting paternalistically to defend their actions against their deception that it was therefore in the deceived individual's best interest. 
 If the deceived individual discovers they have been lied to, problems may go unsolved and unnecessary resentments may linger, whether it was done in their best interest or not.

See also
 Beings that some parents tell their children are real: Easter Bunny, Santa Claus, Tooth Fairy
 Lie-to-children
 Lying by omission
 Noble lie
 Paternalism
 Psychological manipulation

References

Further reading
 
 

Parenting
Deception